The Grootfontein Reformed Church is a congregation affiliated with the Reformed Churches in South Africa (GKSA) and located in Grootfontein, Namibia. It was officially founded on May 29, 1943, and celebrated its 75th anniversary the weekend of May 26–27, 2018.

The Rev. H.S. van Jaarsveld, after whom the Biermanskool Reformed Church was originally named Vanjaarsveld in honor of his pioneering work in South West Africa (SWA), helped as a custodian in services for the Reformed Churches in the north of the mandate territory. He helped found Grootfontein in 1943, as he had the Outjo Reformed Church (1930), the second oldest congregation in northern Namibia.

Initially, the congregation met for services in the building of the Dutch Reformed Church in South Africa (NHK), already founded in the same town on September 4, 1937, 35 days after the first NHK church in the Southwest in Gobabis and 14 days after the second in Otjiwarongo. In Grootfontein's case, the local Dutch Reformed Church in South Africa (NGK) (founded in 1944) was the youngest of the three Afrikaner churches. The GKSA worshippers continued to use the NHK church until 1956, when the former built their own.

On September 17, 1949, the young GKSA congregation petitioned the city government for their own church grounds. On May 20, 1950, the church council obtained approval. The site was located on historic grounds where the Angola-Boers of the Dorsland Trek, under the leadership of their president Diederik Prinsloo, had founded the Republic of Upingtonia (in existence from 1885 to 1886). The "burgers" of the republic were all Doppers (GKSA members). Two great sycamores, planted as gateposts in 1928, overshadowed the footpath.

In 1953, the congregation began raising money, eventually earning £85 in the construction fund. In 1955, the local GKSA farmers volunteered 5 percent of their herds for the project. The church branded the best of the cattle, the farmers grazed them for free, and proceeds from their sale went directly towards the building project.

Ene Meyer, the architect, drew up a blueprint in 1964, which the council approved. A building committee was formed, including the Rev. E.W. Meyer, elder L.A. Grobler (convener), N. van der Walt, P. du Toit, and J.H. du Plessis. An R22,000 bid from a Mr. Harteveld in Gobabis was accepted. Karel Strydom and a Mr. Arends made the pulpit, tables, chairs, and pews of dolf wood, gathered by members along with marula tree wood and other local lumber. Members later overlaid the pews. The organ was also donated to the church.

One of the elders on the building committee, Jan Harm (Boet Jannie) du Plessis (born July 28, 1921, Mombolo, Angola, and died May 14, 1984, in Walvis Bay), had a father, Lourens Marthienus du Plessis, who was born June 19, 1886, in the short-lived Upingtonia, on the church's future grounds. L.M. du Plessis withdrew to Angola, but died on May 16, 1962, in Onkoshi, near Tsumeb.

The church building was dedicated on February 27–28, 1965. A member, Nelie Prinsloo, received the key and unlocked the door. Prof. W.J. Snyman observed the opening and revealed the memorial monolith.

Grootfontein is one of the exceptions to the relative stability of the GKSA in Namibia in the first 15 years of the 21st century, shrinking from a membership (confirmed and baptized) of 188 at the end of 1997 to one of 54 at the end of 2014.

Pastors 
 Van Vuuren, Christoffel Johannes, 1969–1976
 Kruger, Izak Jacobus Vorster, 1977–1983
 Opperman, Dr. Wilhelm Carl, 1983–1986
 Hattingh, Hermanus Bernardus, 1987–1989
 Van der Linde, Johannes Lodewicus, 1989–1993 (together with Rundu); 1993–1995
 Grobler, Johannes Hendrik, 1996-2001
 Du Plessis, Jan Barend, 2008–2013 (together with Tsumeb); accepted his emeritus
 De Villiers, S.A. (Stephanu), 2018 – present

Sources 
 (af) Harris, C.T., Noëth, J.G., Sarkady, N.G., Schutte, F.M. en Van Tonder, J.M. 2010. Van seringboom tot kerkgebou: die argitektoniese erfenis van die Gereformeerde Kerke. Potchefstroom: Administratiewe Buro.
 (en) Potgieter, D.J. (chief ed.) Standard Encyclopaedia of Southern Africa. Cape Town: Nasionale Opvoedkundige Uitgewery Ltd., 1973.
 (en) Raper, P.E. 1987. Dictionary of South African Place Names. Johannesburg: Lowry Publishers.
 (af) Schalekamp, Dm. M.E. (chairman: edition commission). 2001. Die Almanak van die Gereformeerde Kerke in Suid-Afrika vir die jaar 2002. Potchefstroom: Administratiewe Buro.
 (af) Van der Walt, Dr. S.J. (chairman: almanac deputies). 1997. Die Almanak van die Gereformeerde Kerke in Suid-Afrika vir die jaar 1998. Potchefstroom: Administratiewe Buro.
 (af) Ammi Venter (chief ed.) 1957. Almanak van die Gereformeerde Kerk in Suid-Afrika vir die jaar 1958. Potchefstroom: Administratiewe Buro.
 (af) Venter, Dm. A.A. (chief ed.) 1958. Almanak van die Gereformeerde Kerk in Suid-Afrika vir die jaar 1959. Potchefstroom: Administratiewe Buro.
 (af) Vogel, Willem (ed.). 2014. Die Almanak van die Gereformeerde Kerke in Suid-Afrika vir die jaar 2015. Potchefstroom: Administratiewe Buro.

Afrikaner culture in Namibia
Otjozondjupa Region
Churches in Namibia
1943 establishments in South West Africa
Christian organizations established in 1943
Protestantism in Namibia
Reformed Churches in South Africa